UFC Fight Night: Miocic vs. Hunt (also known as UFC Fight Night 65) was a mixed martial arts event held on 10 May 2015 at the Adelaide Entertainment Centre in Adelaide, South Australia.

Background
The event was the first that the promotion has held in South Australia.

The event was headlined by a heavyweight bout between top contenders Stipe Miocic and Mark Hunt.  The fight saw Miocic set the record for the number of total strikes landed in a UFC bout, with Miocic landing 361 strikes.  Miocic also outlanded Hunt 361–46 in total strikes with the 315 strike differential being the largest margin in UFC history.

Andreas Ståhl was expected to face Kyle Noke at the event. However, on 2 April, it was announced that Ståhl pulled out of the fight due to undisclosed reasons and was replaced by promotional newcomer Jonavin Webb.

Seo Hee Ham was expected to face Bec Rawlings at the event. However, on 10 April, Ham pulled out of the bout due to an undisclosed injury and was replaced by Lisa Ellis.

Results

Bonus awards
The following fighters were awarded $50,000 bonuses:

Fight of the Night: None awarded
Performance of the Night: Robert Whittaker, James Vick, Dan Hooker, and Alex Chambers

See also

2015 in UFC
List of UFC events
Mixed martial arts in Australia

References

UFC Fight Night
2015 in mixed martial arts
Mixed martial arts in Australia
Sport in Adelaide
2015 in Australian sport
May 2015 sports events in Oceania